Bang is a 1995 American crime drama film directed by Ash Baron-Cohen (aka Ash) who is the cousin of well-known TV and film performer, Sacha Baron Cohen.

Plot
Bang is a story about an unnamed young woman living in Los Angeles, played by Darling Narita. It explores her transformation from being a victim to being in control, after a series of incidents which cause her to snap.

Cast
The film features an early film appearance by Lucy Liu.

References

External links
 
 

1995 films
1995 crime drama films
American crime drama films
American independent films
1995 directorial debut films
1995 independent films
1990s English-language films
1990s American films